Neyde Marisa Pina Barbosa (born 23 September 1980) is an Angolan handball player. She plays on the Angola women's national handball team and participated at the 2011 World Women's Handball Championship in Brazil, and the 2004, 2012 and 2016 Summer Olympics.

References

External links
 

1980 births
Living people
People from Benguela
Angolan female handball players
Handball players at the 2004 Summer Olympics
Handball players at the 2012 Summer Olympics
Handball players at the 2016 Summer Olympics
Olympic handball players of Angola
African Games gold medalists for Angola
African Games medalists in handball
Competitors at the 2011 All-Africa Games